Mattias Guter (born July 23, 1988) is a Swedish former professional ice hockey player. He last played with Djurgårdens IF of the Swedish Hockey League (SHL).

Guter made his Elitserien debut playing with Djurgårdens IF during the 2007–08 Elitserien season.

References

External links

1988 births
Living people
Almtuna IS players
Djurgårdens IF Hockey players
Karlskrona HK players
Leksands IF players
Luleå HF players
IK Oskarshamn players
Swedish ice hockey right wingers
Timrå IK players
HC Vita Hästen players
Ice hockey people from Stockholm